Black is a self-titled album by Black, the musical vehicle of Colin Vearncombe. It is a retrospective album released in 1987 by Black's former label Warner Music Group after his commercial breakthrough with the album Wonderful Life (on A&M Records) and comprises several singles recorded while Vearncombe was signed to Warner.

Track listing
Side One
 "Hey Presto"
 "Stephen"
 "Liquid Dream"
 "More Than The Sun"
Side Two
 "Widemouth" *
 "I Could Kill You"
 "Butterfly Man"

Catalog# : WX 137

 All songs written by Colin Vearncombe and David (Dickie) Dix.
 All tracks (P)1984 Warner Music Group except *(P)1987 Warner Music Group (C)1987 Warner Music Group

This vinyl album has never been re-released in CD format.

References

External links
 http://www.discogs.com/Black-Black/release/795628

1987 compilation albums
Black (singer) albums
Albums produced by Peter Walsh
Warner Music Group compilation albums